Solarize is the second studio album of American indie pop duo  Capital Cities, released on August 10, 2018, under Capitol Records. It was preceded by the 2017 EP Swimming Pool Summer of which the tracks were integrated on this release.

Track listing
All songs written and produced by Ryan Merchant and Sebu Simonian, except where noted.

Personnel 
Adapted from the liner notes.

Featured artists 

 Sebu Simonian - vocals (tracks 1-14), programming (tracks 1-12, 14)
 Ryan Merchant - vocals (tracks 1-14), programming (tracks 1-10, 12, 14), guitar (tracks 3, 11), bass (tracks 3, 11)
 Jim Svejda - voiceover (track 9)

Additional musicians 

 Aaron Prather - drums (tracks 2, 7)
 Nick Merwin - guitar (tracks 2, 7, 13)
 Will Artope - trumpet (tracks 2, 6-8, 13)
 Artyom Manukyan - cello (track 2)
 Manny Quintero - bass (tracks 2, 7-8, 12-13)
 Sacha - rap vocalist (track 3)
 Jacob Scesney - saxophone (tracks 4, 10)
 Adam Friedman - bass (track 5), guitar (track 5)
 Justin Thomas - vibraphone (track 7)
 Anna Margo - vocals (track 8)
 Krikor Sarafian - guitar (track 8)
 Channing Holmes - drums (track 12)

Production 

 Sebu Simonian - production
 Ryan Merchant - production
 Adam Friedman - co-production (track 3), additional production (track 5)
 The Ceasars - co-production (track 6)
 Rodney "Darkchild" Jerkins - co-production (track 7)
 Sermstyle - additional production (track 13)
 Serban Ghenea - mixer (track 13)
 John Hanes - assistant mixer (track 13)
 Andrew Mendelson - mastering (tracks 1-12, 14)
 Mike Marsh - mastering (track 13)
 João Lauro Fonte - artwork
 Dan Weisman - management

References

2018 albums
Capital Cities (band) albums
Capitol Records albums